It's All About is the 1968 debut album by British band Spooky Tooth, released in the United Kingdom by Island Records on 26 July 1968.

In West Germany the record was released by Fontana. The American version of the album, entitled Spooky Tooth, was originally released on Bell in 1968. It was reissued in 1971 by A&M Records as Tobacco Road.

Critical reception 
Robert Christgau reviewed the album's 1971 American reissue in Christgau's Record Guide: Rock Albums of the Seventies (1981), preferring it to the band's other records, "before anybody had figured out how to really exploit all these iron zeppelins and lead butterflies". He concluded that it "offers Beatles harmonies, a roundabout song that preceded Yes's, and a straight remake of 'The Weight' in addition to the hilariously melosoulful John D. Loudermilk cover that provides its U.S. title. Ahh, the good old days."

Track listing

Original album

1971 Tobacco Road release

Personnel
Spooky Tooth
 Mike Harrison – vocals, keyboards, harpsichord
 Luther Grosvenor – guitar
 Gary Wright – vocals, keyboards, organ
 Greg Ridley – bass
 Mike Kellie – drums, percussion

Technical
 Produced by Jimmy Miller
 Engineer: Glyn Johns
 Liner notes: Alan Robinson
 Album photography: Gered Mankowitz

References

External links
 
 Official Spooky Tooth website

1968 debut albums
Spooky Tooth albums
Island Records albums
Albums produced by Jimmy Miller
Albums recorded at Olympic Sound Studios